Projić (Serbian Cyrillic: Пројић) is a mountain in southwestern Serbia, near the town of Priboj. Its highest peak has an elevation of 1,256 meters above sea level.

References

Mountains of Serbia